Wang Na (born January 27, 1984) is a Chinese former synchronized swimmer who competed in the 2004 Summer Olympics and the 2008 Summer Olympics. She was on the team that won a bronze medal at the 2008 Olympics, which was China's first ever Olympic medal in the sport.

Retired at the age of 25, Wang Na was immediately named one of the two head coaches of the Chinese national team in 2009, becoming the youngest head coach in the team's history. Also hired as a head coach was her former teammate Zhang Xiaohuan, and together the two rookie coaches guided Team China to three golds at the 2010 Asian Games. She left her coaching position in 2011, probably when she was preparing for her pregnancy.

Personal life
Wang Na married badminton player Cai Yun in 2010. She gave birth to a daughter in 2012, and to a second child in probably late 2014. (Before them, Wang Na's teammate Hu Ni and Cai Yun's doubles partner-turned-coach Zhang Jun married in 2006.)

References

1984 births
Living people
Olympic bronze medalists for China
Olympic synchronized swimmers of China
People from Langzhong
Synchronized swimmers at the 2004 Summer Olympics
Synchronized swimmers at the 2008 Summer Olympics
Olympic medalists in synchronized swimming
Asian Games medalists in artistic swimming
Synchronized swimmers from Sichuan
Artistic swimmers at the 2006 Asian Games
Medalists at the 2008 Summer Olympics
Chinese synchronized swimmers
World Aquatics Championships medalists in synchronised swimming
Synchronized swimmers at the 2009 World Aquatics Championships
Asian Games gold medalists for China
Medalists at the 2006 Asian Games
Synchronized swimming coaches
20th-century Chinese women
21st-century Chinese women